Ladd Herzeg was general manager of the Houston Oilers in the 1970s and 1980s, under ownership of Bud Adams.   In three years, from 1982 to 1984, with the Oilers he drafted and/or signed three Pro Football Hall of Famers;  Mike Munchak a 1st round draft choice in 1982, Bruce Matthews another 1st round draft choice in 1983 and Warren Moon a 1984 Canadian Football League signing.

References

Year of birth missing (living people)
Living people
Houston Oilers executives
National Football League general managers